Monty Faithfull (16 June 1847 – 22 October 1908) was an Australian cricketer. He played two first-class matches for New South Wales between 1870/71 and 1874/75.

See also
 List of New South Wales representative cricketers

References

External links
 

1847 births
1908 deaths
Australian cricketers
New South Wales cricketers